Eye of the Eagle (also known as The Lost Command) is a 1987 action-thriller film directed and produced by Cirio H. Santiago, written by Joseph Zucohero, and starring Brett Baxter, Cec Verrell, William Steis, Ed Crick and Robert Patrick. It was followed in 1989 by Eye of the Eagle 2: Inside the Enemy.

Plot
Sgt. Rick Stratton sets out to stop a band of renegades known as the Lost Command who are terrorizing South Vietnam.

Cast
Brett Baxter Clark as Sgt. Stratton
Robert Patrick as Cpl. Johnny Ransom
Ed Crick as Sgt. Bo Rattner
William Steis as Capt. Carter
Cec Verrell as Chris Chandler
Rey Malonzo as Cpl. Willy Leung
Mike Monty as Col. Stark
Vic Diaz as Col. Trang
Henry Strzalkowski as Cpl Weasel Watkins
Willie Williams as Gimme Five
Nick Nicholson as Pfc. Crazy Dog
David Light as Sgt. Maddox
Mel Davidson as Cpl. Beller
Jim Moss as Sgt. Warden
Tony Beso as Lol Pot
Jerry Hart as Doctor
David Anderson as Special Forces Officer
Steve Rogers as Sgt. Rattner's Men

Reception
Timothy Young of mondo-esoterica.net recommended it as "An action packed trashy war film that ticks almost all the necessary boxes" and called it "One for fans of low budget action and exploitation films."

Criticonline.com's review reads, "If you like war action films, EYE OF THE EAGLE is a good way to spend 82 minutes."

Eric Reifschneider of bloodbrothersfilms.com gave the film a negative review of 1/5, writing, "All aspects of this film are just downright poor, from its writing, to its editing, to its acting."

External links

References

1987 films
1987 direct-to-video films
Vietnam War films
1987 action films
American action thriller films
Philippine action thriller films
Direct-to-video action films
1980s English-language films
Films directed by Cirio H. Santiago
1980s American films